Duane Mansion is a property in Duanesburg, New York that was listed on the National Register of Historic Places in 1987.

It was built by Solomon Kelly sometime during the 1812 to 1816 period in fine Federal style.

Jacques Remee provided landscape architecture for formal gardens.  Unfortunately no trace remains of these gardens.

The additional buildings include an "outstanding" Federal style carriage barn, another single bay carriage house, a hay barn, a corn crib, and a shed.

The mansion seems unornamented, yet in fact represents a sophisticated design.  It's located on a hilltop, and seems isolated though being only about a mile away from Interstate 88.

The property was covered in a 1984 multiple resource area study of Duanesburg properties which provides much background on the Duane family.  The study describes the mansion as "a squarish, two-story frame residence with a low hipped roof, prominent two-story piazza supported by Doric columns, round-topped floor length windows opening onto the piazza, and three identical entrances supported by gabled porches supported by slender Ionic columns.  With its simply, symmetrical form and sophisticated detailing, it is a distinctive example of Federal design and an unusual rural interpretation of the Adamesque vocabulary."  After further substantive review, the property was individually listed on the National Register in 1987.

References

Houses on the National Register of Historic Places in New York (state)
Houses in Schenectady County, New York
Federal architecture in New York (state)
Houses completed in 1816
1816 establishments in New York (state)
National Register of Historic Places in Schenectady County, New York